Violent by Nature is the second album from Arizona thrash metal band Atrophy, released in 1990 on Roadrunner Records. Like their previous album Socialized Hate, it was co-produced by prolific producer/engineer Bill Metoyer, and recorded in Los Angeles. The band followed up the album with tours of the US and Europe with the likes of Sacred Reich, Coroner and Forced Entry. However shortly after, Chris Lykins left the band to pursue a medical school course and the band split up after Roadrunner Records lost confidence in the band due to the departure of one of its leading songwriters;  as such, Violent by Nature would be Atrophy's final album before their 22-year breakup from 1993 to 2015. The model for the artwork was Richie Bujinowski (now Cavalera), who would later become Max Cavalera's adopted stepson and the frontman of Incite.

Track listing
"Puppies and Friends" (Chris Lykins, Rick Skowron, Tim Kelly) – 3:32
"Violent By Nature" (Lykins, Kelly) – 3:54
"In Their Eyes" (Lykins, James Gulotta, Skowron, Kelly) – 5:02
"Too Late to Change" (Lykins, Gulotta) – 5:29
"Slipped Through the Cracks" (Lykins) – 5:28
"Forgotten But Not Gone" (Brian Zimmerman, Gulotta, Kelly) – 5:00
"Process of Elimination" (Zimmerman, Gulotta, Kelly) – 4:46
"Right to Die" (Zimmerman, Gulotta, Kelly) – 4:00
"Things Change" (Lykins) – 4:05

Credits
 Brian Zimmerman – vocals
 Chris Lykins – guitar
 Rick Skowron – guitar
 James Gulotta – bass
 Tim Kelly – drums
 Kevin Sparks – 12-string guitar on "Too Late to Change"
 Recorded and mixed at Track Record, North Hollywood, California, USA
 Produced by Bill Metoyer and Atrophy
 Engineered and mixed by Bill Metoyer
 Second engineered by Ken Paulakovich
 Mastered by Eddie Schreyer at Futuredisc, Hollywood, USA
 Cover art by Paul Stottler

External links
Roadrunner Records band page
BNR Metal discography page
Encyclopaedia Metallum album entry

1990 albums
Atrophy (band) albums